Phlox austromontana is a species of phlox known by the common name mountain phlox. It is native to the southwestern United States and Baja California, where it grows in forested and wooded mountain habitat, scrub, and open areas. It is a mat-forming perennial herb growing in patches of very short stems. The lance-shaped leaves are no more than 1.5 centimeters long and are arranged oppositely in pairs on the short stems. The inflorescence is a solitary flower at the tip of each stem. The flower is white or light pink or lavender with five rounded lobes. It is just over a centimeter long.

References

External links

Jepson Manual Treatment
Photo gallery

austromontana
Flora of North America